Little Italy is an unincorporated community in Clay County, West Virginia, United States.  It lies at an elevation of 787 feet (240 m).

A large share of the early settlers being natives of Italy caused the name to be selected.

References

Italian-American culture in West Virginia
Little Italys in the United States
Unincorporated communities in West Virginia
Unincorporated communities in Clay County, West Virginia
Charleston, West Virginia metropolitan area